Scott Jackson (born February 5, 1987) is a Canadian former professional ice hockey defenceman who played in one game for the Tampa Bay Lightning of the National Hockey League (NHL). He was selected by the St. Louis Blues in the second round (37th overall) of the 2005 NHL Entry Draft.

Playing career
Signed as a free agent on July 3, 2008 by the Tampa Bay Lightning, Jackson was called up to the "Bolts" from the American Hockey League's Norfolk Admirals on April 11, 2010. Jackson went on to make his NHL debut later that day when the Lightning visited the Florida Panthers in the final game of the 2009-10 regular season.

Career statistics

Regular season and playoffs

International

See also
List of players who played only one game in the NHL

References

External links
 

1987 births
Canadian ice hockey defencemen
Living people
Mississippi Sea Wolves players
Norfolk Admirals players
People from Salmon Arm
Seattle Thunderbirds players
St. Louis Blues draft picks
Tampa Bay Lightning players